Steve Ahlquist (born 1963) is an American journalist, comic book writer, graphic novelist, and humanist from Rhode Island.

Ahlquist is the founder and editor-in-chief of Uprise RI, a Rhode Island based news site covering issues of social justice, human rights, progressive politics and climate change. He is also the President and founding member of Humanists of Rhode Island.

He is known for his reporting on Uprise RI, which has been credited with informing and sustaining the movement against a proposed fracked-gas power plant in Burrillville, Rhode Island.

Personal life 
Ahlquist is the former owner of retail comics and video store Atomic Comics & Video.

He is the uncle of Jessica Ahlquist, an activist and public speaker who filed a lawsuit in 2012 against Cranston High School West, where she was a student, to remove a religious prayer from its auditorium.

Journalism career 

Jerry Elmer, a senior attorney with the Conservation Law Foundation, credits Ahlquist and his reporting on Uprise RI with informing and sustaining the movement against a proposed fracked-gas power plant in Burrillville, Rhode Island.

Previously he wrote for RI Future, but left around October 2017. Shortly after, on November 1, 2017, he founded Uprise RI.

Burillville Power Plant movement 
Through his coverage on Uprise RI, Ahlquist has been credited with informing and sustaining the movement against a fracked-gas power plant in Burrillville, Rhode Island, which was proposed by Chicago-based energy developer Invenergy.

In November 2017, Ahlquist was denied press access to an event related to the proposed power plant. A public relations officer representing the event, hosted by the New England Coalition for Affordable Energy and Rhode Islanders for Affordable Energy, wrote in an email that “We’re inviting only non-partisan/non-activist outlets like the ProJo, NPR, etc.". Providence Journal Reporter Alex Kuffner later gave Ahlquist a recording of the entire event.

In 2019 Ahlquist was selected as a speaker at the TEDxProvidence conference, where he discussed his ongoing coverage of the proposed fracked-gas power plant in Burrillville, Rhode Island.

Rhode Island Open Meetings Act controversies 
In at least two notable instances, Ahlquist has been confronted by representatives of Rhode Island state or local government and asked to cease recording of public meetings. Rhode Island's Open Meetings Act authorizes individuals to record public meetings. In these two instances, Steven Brown, the Executive Director of the Rhode Island American Civil Liberties Union, has defended Ahlquist and reminded representatives of their obligations under the Open Meetings Act.

In 2017, at a Cranston City Council meeting, council President Michael Farina told the chamber audience that recording devices were prohibited. Ahlquist protested, saying “That's actually not legal.” Farina responded, citing municipal rule “34b.” Ahlquist continued objecting, and Farina said he would make a one-time exception. Brown wrote a letter to Councilor Farina stating, "We have reviewed the City Council's rules and have been unable to find any rule, including Rule 34(b), that contains the ban you cited." Brown then stated that if a rule 34b existed it would be unlawful and cited precedents Belcher v. Mansi, Lemus v. Providence Board Zoning Board of Review, and Staven v. Portsmouth Financial Subcommittee.

In 2018, Wayne Kezirian, then chairman of the Rhode Island Public Transit Authority, sent Chief Security Officer James Pereira to the back of the room to instruct Ahlquist to cease recording. After Ahlquist noted that the law allowed him to record Pereira responded “That's just access. Access to the meeting.” In a November 20, 2018 letter, Brown noted that, "...Rhode Island's Open Meetings Act authorizes individuals to record public meetings. There is thus no excuse for a public body, and particularly a major state agency like RIPTA, to claim ignorance of the law in this regard. That is especially true for an employee like Mr. Pereira, who is no minor functionary.

Comic Books and Graphic Novels 

Ahlquist is the creator of Oz Squad, a modern comic book continuation of the L. Frank Baum Oz children's book series. He is also the co-creator (along with Chris Reilly) of Strange Eggs, an anthology published by SLG Publishing. His most recent work is Oz Squad: March of the Tin Soldiers, a novel continuing the Oz Squad comic book series.

Recognition

Humanists of Rhode Island honored Ahlquist with their Rhode Island Humanist of the Year award in 2014. The award was established in 2013 to recognize a Rhode Island area resident who has made a significant contribution to the advancement of humanist values in the state through the force of ideas and action.

He was the recipient of Rhode Island Pride's 2015 Spirit of Pride Award for his coverage of same-sex marriage in Rhode Island, hate crimes committed against members of the LGBT community, HIV stigmatization, and other social justice issues on RI Future. Rhode Island Pride Chairman Kurt Bagley described Ahlquist as someone who “gives activists and protestors a voice, a microphone and a camera.”

In 2018 he was presented with the DARE award, for his coverage of DARE actions, and of Rhode Island activists generally, on Uprise RI. Justice Gaines, emcee of the event, stated that Ahlquist's journalism "...is invaluable work to our movement and the movements of our allies, partners and the overall organizing geography in Rhode Island.”

At the seventh annual Red Bandana award ceremony, held in June 2019, Ahlquist was awarded the Red Bandana Award for his journalism on Uprise RI.

Ahlquist was selected as a speaker at the 2019 TEDxProvidence conference, where he discussed his ongoing coverage of the proposed fracked-gas power plant in Burrillville, Rhode Island.

Bill Bartholomew, host of The Bartholomewtown Podcast, has stated that Ahlquist was one of the primary influences in Bartholomew's choice to enter political journalism in Rhode Island.

References

1963 births
Living people
Writers from Rhode Island